Cochran's croaking gecko (Aristelliger cochranae), also commonly known as Cochran's Caribbean gecko and the Navassa gecko, is a species of lizard in the family Sphaerodactylidae. The species was described in 1931 by Chapman Grant and named after notable American herpetologist and artist Doris Mable Cochran. The species received one of its common names from the loud croaking call of the male during the mating period.

Description
It has relatively short and massive legs. The colour of its body varies from beige brown to chestnut red and the back exhibits light spots. A dark chestnut crossband extends from the snout to the head, the nape, and the eyes. The largest part of the tail is dark grey to black. The hatchlings have clear white crossbands on the tail.

Occurrence and biology
Cochran's croaking gecko is endemic to Navassa Island, an island between Haiti and Jamaica. It is relatively common despite its small habitat of 5.2 km² (2 sq mi).  It is nocturnal and arboreal, which means that it lives and preys entirely on the branches or under the bark of ficus trees or fan palms (Thrinax morrisii ). Its diet consists of insects.

References

Further reading
Schwartz, Albert; Henderson, Robert W. (1991). Amphibians and Reptiles of the West Indies: Descriptions, Distributions, and Natural History. Gainesville, Florida: University Press of Florida. 714 pp. .
Schwartz, Albert; Thomas, Richard (1975). A Check-list of West Indian Amphibians and Reptiles. Carnegie Museum of Natural History Special Publication No. 1. Pittsburgh, Pennsylvania: Carnegie Museum of Natural History. 216 pp. (Aristelliger cochranae, p. 108).

External links
Herpetology of Navassa Island, West Indies
Relationship of Diet and Prey Availability in Aristelliger cochranae, a Gecko from Navassa Island, West Indies

Aristelliger
Lizards of the Caribbean
Reptiles of Haiti
Endemic fauna of Navassa Island
Reptiles described in 1931
Taxa named by Chapman Grant